Radobýl is a basalt hill in České středohoří mountains, Czech Republic. It rises above village of Žalhostice on right bank of the Elbe River 3 km west of Litoměřice. Part of the hill with abandoned basalt quarry and rich rock steppe flora is under protection as Radobýl Nature Monument (Přírodní památka Radobýl). The hill is a popular hiking destination. From huge metallic cross (erected in 1992) on the bare summit there is almost 360-degrees panoramic view of central part of České středohoří Mts., Litoměřice, Terezín and Lovosice.

In 1944–1945, the Richard I and II subterranean factories were excavated under Radobýl by forced laborers of Leitmeritz concentration camp.

References

Environment, Litoměřická vinařská stezka. Retrieved 10 October 2010.

Mountains and hills of the Czech Republic